Oedicerotidae is a family of amphipods. It comprises the following genera:

Aborolobatea Ledoyer, 1984
Acanthostepheia Boeck, 1871
Aceroides Sars, 1895
Americhelidium Bousfield & Chevrier, 1996
Ameroculodes Bousfield & Chevrier, 1996
Anoediceros Pirlot, 1932
Arrhinopsis Stappers, 1911
Arrhis Stebbing, 1906
Bathymedon Sars, 1892
Carolobatea Stebbing, 1899
Caviphaxus Ren, 1992
Chitonomandibulum Jo, 1990
Cornudilla Barnard & Karaman, 1991
Deflexilodes Bousfield & Chevrier, 1996
Eochelidium Bousfield & Chevrier, 1996
Finoculodes J. L. Barnard, 1971
Gulbarentsia Stebbing, 1894
Halicreion Boeck, 1871
Hartmanodes Bousfield & Chevrier, 1996
Hongkongvena Hirayama, 1992
Kroyera Bate, 1857
Limnoculodes Bousfield & Chevrier, 1996
Lopiceros J. L. Barnard, 1961
Machaironyx Coyle, 1980
Monoculodes Stimpson, 1853
Monoculodopsis Ledoyer, 1973
Monoculopsis Sars, 1895
Oedicerina Stephensen, 1931
Oediceroides Stebbing, 1888
Oediceropsis Lilljeborg, 1865
Oediceros Krøyer, 1842
Pacifoculodes Bousfield & Chevrier, 1996
Paramonoculopsis Alonso de Pina, 1997
Paraperioculodes Barnard, 1931
Parexoediceros Bousfield, 1983
Paroediceroides Schellenberg, 1931
Paroediceros Sars, 1895
Perioculodes Sars, 1895
Perioculopsis Schellenberg, 1925
Pontocrates Boeck, 1871
Pseudoculodes
Rostroculodes Bousfield & Chevrier, 1996
Sinoediceros Shen, 1995
Synchelidium Sars, 1895
Westwoodilla Bate, 1862

References

External links
Oedicerotidae Lilljeborg, 1865 from Crustacea.net

Gammaridea
Taxa named by Wilhelm Lilljeborg
Crustacean families